Mark Robert Timothy Garnier  (born 26 February 1963) is a British Conservative Party politician and former banker. He was first elected as Member of Parliament (MP) for Wyre Forest at the 2010 general election. Garnier was re-elected at the 2015, 2017 and 2019 general elections. He was a junior minister at the Department for International Trade from July 2016 to January 2018.

Since 2020, he has been chair of the Committees on Arms Export Controls.

Early life and career 
Mark Garnier was born in London to Peter and Patricia Garnier on 26 February 1963. He was privately educated at the private Dulwich College Preparatory School, London, and Charterhouse. In 1981, he joined the London Stock Exchange as a junior clerk on the Gilts Markets. In 1986, he left to join a succession of investment banks, working in the Far East Equity markets. Between 1989 and 1995 he worked as managing director for South China Securities, he followed this with a directorship for a year at the Japanese investment company Daiwa Securities Group.

Garnier subsequently worked as an associate director at Edmond de Rothschild Group and US investment bank Bear Stearns. Between 1999 and 2005, he worked as an independent hedge fund manager before becoming a partner at US equities company CGR Capital. After working for CGR Capital for three years, he became a partner at both Severn Capital and Augmentor.

Garnier was a district councillor of the Forest of Dean District Council from 2003 to 2007.

Parliamentary career 
Garnier first contested the Wyre Forest seat for the Conservative Party at the 2005 general election but finished in second place behind the sitting independent MP Richard Taylor. At the next general election in 2010, Garnier was elected as MP for the constituency with 18,793 (36.9%) votes and a majority of 2,643 (5.2%). He retained the seat at the 2015 general election with 22,394 (45.3%) votes and an increased majority of 12,871 (26%). Garnier also retained the seat at the 2017 snap general election with 29,859 (58.4%) votes and an increased majority of 13,334 (26.1%).

Much of Garnier's work in Parliament is focused on his constituency of Wyre Forest, including education, healthcare and economic development. In the latter category, Garnier is an enthusiastic supporter of HS2. He believes that Birmingham Airport will be an increasingly significant hub for the region that will help to ease pressure on Heathrow. Garnier has also taken a centralist business approach to EU membership, choosing to eschew scepticism, but focus on the economic and trading gains to be had from trading relationships. Developing the theme of deregulation, Garnier perceives the right environment for business to be essential. This can be achieved for young people through vocational courses in higher education that offer practical skills to become entrepreneurial.

Garnier previously served on the Treasury Select Committee and raised a debate in the House on Commons on 29 November 2010 (with several other Conservative MPs) on the regulation of independent financial advisers. Garnier also serves on several All-Party Parliamentary Groups and was previously Deputy Chairman of the APPG concerning Space.

In a speech on 19 January 2012, Garnier criticised a Labour proposal to set a minimum age for owning a shotgun certificate, arguing that shooting was a major competitive sport and that based on Countryside Alliance statistics there was "no reason" to feel uncomfortable with under-10s having licensed access to shotguns.

Throughout his time in Parliament, Garnier, himself a smoker, has campaigned strongly to end tobacco smuggling. In 2012 it was reported he had accepted tickets for the Chelsea Flower Show from Japan Tobacco International (JTI), costing £1,100. Commenting on this he said: "All of us who are MPs in Worcestershire have taken pay cuts of some form or other from coming out of the private sector... If we wanted to have our nose in the trough I could go back to being an investment banker. The reason I'm an MP is the complete opposite to having my nose in the trough. Two years of hundred-hour weeks. To pick on this one thing is really irritating."

Garnier was named by the ConservativeHome website as one of a minority of loyal Conservative backbench MPs not to have voted against the government in any significant rebellions in September 2012. Garner was subsequently one of 80 Conservative MPs to oppose the Coalition's Marriage (Same Sex Couples) Act 2013.

In December 2014, Garnier was criticised by Labour's Jonathan Ashworth for comments he made during a speech at the Institute of Economic Affairs. Garnier said of the need for a stronger message to Conservative supporters: "We need to be giving a much clearer message to them that they don't have to worry about politicians mucking around with tax rates in order to try and attract a few dog-end voters in the outlying regions of the country." Garnier later said: "If I used slack language in order to make a point, I am sorry if I caused any offence to anybody. I believe every voter is important everywhere."

Garnier expressed disappointment at the decision of the regulator not to investigate incentives, pay and culture of the banks and their potential association with misconduct including the Libor scandal.

In the lead-up to the 2016 EU membership referendum Garnier supported the unsuccessful "Remain" campaign. In October 2017, he said that 'doom-mongers like himself' had been proved wrong since the Brexit vote.

On 17 July 2016, he was appointed to the newly created position of Parliamentary Under-Secretary of State for International Trade but was dismissed on 9 January 2018 after the cabinet reshuffle.

In October 2017, the Cabinet Office began an investigation into a potential breach of the ministerial code after The Mail on Sunday revealed he had sent an aide, whom he called "sugar tits", to buy two vibrators from a sex shop while he waited outside, allegedly one for his wife and one for a colleague who worked at his constituency office. The investigation, which reported on 21 December 2017, concluded that Garnier did not break the ministerial code (the incidents having occurred before he was appointed) and had not acted inappropriately since becoming a minister.

Garnier was the local MP of Natalie Connolly, a woman killed in 2016. Garnier, alongside MP Harriet Harman have since taken action to resolve the issues of the "rough sex" defence by advocating amendments to the Domestic Abuse Bill in England and Wales.

In July 2020, Garnier was selected as chair of the Committees on Arms Export Controls. The committee examines export licensing decisions, such as the decision to resume exports to Saudi Arabia. Private Eye reported that, in 2018, Garnier had taken a 5-day trip to the kingdom, with Saudi Arabia paying the £7,000 cost.

Registered interests 

Currently, Garnier has three incomes in addition to his parliamentary salary and expenses.

He acquired two paid appointments over the course of three weeks from July to September 2020 with a combined income of £90,000. The two appointments – described as advisory – are both connected to space. In addition, Garnier will receive 50,000 share options from a US based company, "contingent upon the company achieving certain financial milestones." He may also receive share options as the result of the second appointment, "terms to be decided."

These recent appointments mean that Garnier currently has three incomes outside his parliamentary earnings. Since April 2019, he has already been earning £10,000 per annum as a speaker for a wealth management company. Taken together with his MP's salary of £81,932, the three additional incomes mean Garnier currently earns at least £181,932 per year. He also employs his wife, Caroline Garnier, as office manager – her salary paid from parliamentary expenses.

1.) Since 8 September 2020, and until further notice, Garnier has been a member of the Advisory Board of Laser Light Communications, in Reston, Virginia, USA. Laser Light Communications is a start-up satellite company which is developing data connectivity through lasers. For this, Garnier receives £5,000 a month. Garnier will receive 50,000 share options, "contingent upon the company achieving certain significant financial milestones." For this appointment, Garnier is expected to work approximately 10 hours per month, or £500 per hour. (Appointment was made on 8 September 2020 and registered on 10 September 2020).

2.) Since 1 October 2020, and until further notice, Garnier has been Chair of the Advisory Board of the Shetland Space Centre, based in Grantown-on-Spey, in north east Scotland. For this, Garnier receives £2,500 a month. In addition, he may receive share options, "terms to be decided". He is expected to work approximately 10 hours per month, or £250 per hour. (Registered 26 October 2020).

3.) Since 1 April 2019, and until 31 March 2022, Garnier has been Principal Speaker for BRI Wealth Management plc, based at Meriden in Solihull. He receives £10,000 per annum, paid in quarterly instalments, for speaking at eight client events and writing occasional articles for client newsletters. This appointment is for 64 hours work per annum in total, or £156.25 per hour.

Garnier said he consulted the Advisory Committee on Business Appointments, ACoBA, about this last appointment. (Registered 25 April 2019, updated 14 April 2020 and 1 February 2021).

Parliamentary interest in space 
In November 2021, Sky News political reporter Sophie Morris reported how Garnier had spoken in the Commons on 22 separate occasions since November 2019, and in three of those appearances had urged fellow MPs to give more support to the space sector. Garnier has urged the adoption of a "three-point strategy" that would enable the UK to have a "cohesive and coherent space policy."

Since July 2015, Garnier has been the Vice-Chair of the All Party Parliamentary Group for Space.  In August 2021, former Carshalton and Wallington Liberal Democrat MP Tom Brake, now Director of Unlock Democracy, wrote to Chris Bryant MP, the Chair of the Commons Select Committee on Standards, to examine the dual roles of those MPs who sit on APPGs while also having paid appointments in the sectors of interest of the APPG. In October 2021, Bryant announced a new "wide-ranging" inquiry into APPGs and into the rules regulations governing these unofficial parliamentary groups.

Personal life 
Garnier is married to Caroline; the couple have three children, named Edward, Jemima and George. His wife works as a manager in his parliamentary office. They live near Abberley, Worcestershire, England.

His cousin, Sir Edward Garnier QC, MP was Solicitor General from 2010 until 2012 and was the Member of Parliament for Harborough from 1992 until 2017.

References

External links 
Mark Garnier MP official constituency website
Mark Garnier MP Conservative Party profile
Wyre Forest Conservatives

Mark Garnier at Wyfopedia
 

1963 births
Living people
People educated at Charterhouse School
UK MPs 2010–2015
Conservative Party (UK) MPs for English constituencies
Bankers from London
UK MPs 2015–2017
UK MPs 2017–2019
UK MPs 2019–present
Conservative Party (UK) councillors
Councillors in Gloucestershire
Free Enterprise Group